The 2018 International Darts Open was the twelfth of thirteen PDC European Tour events on the 2018 PDC Pro Tour. The tournament took place at the SACHSENarena, Riesa, Germany from 14–16 September 2018. It featured a field of 48 players and £135,000 in prize money, with £25,000 going to the winner.

Peter Wright was the defending champion after defeating Kim Huybrechts 6–5 in last year's final, but he was defeated 6–4 by Ryan Searle in the second round.

Gerwyn Price won his first European Tour title by beating Simon Whitlock 8–3 in the final. This tournament was also the first in European Tour history in which none of the top 4 seeds reached the quarter-finals.

Prize money
This is how the prize money is divided:

Prize money will count towards the PDC Order of Merit, the ProTour Order of Merit and the European Tour Order of Merit, with one exception: should a seeded player lose in the second round (last 32), their prize money will not count towards any Orders of Merit, although they still receive the full prize money payment.

Qualification and format
The top 16 entrants from the PDC ProTour Order of Merit on 30 August will automatically qualify for the event and will be seeded in the second round.

The remaining 32 places will go to players from five qualifying events – 18 from the UK Qualifier (held in Barnsley on 3 September), eight from the West/South European Qualifier (held on 13 September), four from the Host Nation Qualifier (held on 13 September), one from the Nordic & Baltic Qualifier (held on 10 August) and one from the East European Qualifier (held on 26 August).

The following players will take part in the tournament:

Top 16
  Peter Wright (second round)
  Mensur Suljović (third round)
  Ian White (third round)
  Jonny Clayton (third round)
  Adrian Lewis (quarter-finals)
  Simon Whitlock (runner-up)
  Joe Cullen (third round)
  Daryl Gurney (third round)
  Gerwyn Price (champion)
  Darren Webster (quarter-finals)
  Max Hopp (second round)
  Stephen Bunting (third round)
  Mervyn King (second round)
  Dave Chisnall (second round)
  Jermaine Wattimena (second round)
  Kim Huybrechts (second round)

UK Qualifier
  Steve West (semi-finals)
  Steve Beaton (third round)
  James Wilson (second round)
  John Henderson (second round)
  Ross Smith (second round)
  Steve Lennon (second round)
  Barry Lynn (second round)
  Kyle Anderson (first round)
  Ryan Searle (quarter-finals)
  Dawson Murschell (first round)
  Matthew Dennant (first round)
  Terry Jenkins (second round)
  Terry Temple (first round)
  Mickey Mansell (second round)
  Ryan Joyce (second round)
  Robert Thornton (first round)
  James Richardson (quarter-finals)
  Adam Huckvale (first round)

West/South European Qualifier
  Dirk van Duijvenbode (first round)
  Ron Meulenkamp (first round)
  José Justicia (first round)
  Jan Dekker (first round)
  Michael Plooy (first round)
  Vincent van der Voort (first round)
  Jelle Klaasen (second round)
  Danny Noppert (semi-finals)

Host Nation Qualifier
  Gabriel Clemens (first round)
  Robert Marijanović (second round)
  Ricardo Pietreczko (first round)
  Martin Schindler (third round)

Nordic & Baltic Qualifier
  Magnus Caris (first round)

East European Qualifier
  Patrik Kovács (first round)

Draw

References

2018 PDC European Tour
2018 in German sport
Riesa
September 2018 sports events in Germany